Edge of the Storm is the debut album by Canadian country music artist Wes Mack. It was released on September 4, 2015 via Universal Music Canada. It includes the top 20 singles "Duet", "Our Soundtrack", "Before You Drive Me Crazy" and "The Way You Let Me Down".

Track listing

Chart performance

Singles

ACurrent single.

References

2015 debut albums
Wes Mack albums
Universal Music Canada albums